Sri Lanka competed at the 2004 Summer Olympics in Athens, Greece, from 13 to 29 August 2004.

Athletics

Sri Lankan athletes have so far achieved qualifying standards in the following athletics events (up to a maximum of 3 athletes in each event at the 'A' Standard, and 1 at the 'B' Standard). Susanthika Jayasinghe was slated to be on the entry list for the women's 100 metres, but did not compete. She placed third in the same distance, and silver medalist, in the women's 200 metres in Sydney, but a fracture in her right leg caused her to pull out, though she did travel to Athens.

Men
Track & road events

Field events

Women
Track & road events

Key
Note–Ranks given for track events are within the athlete's heat only
Q = Qualified for the next round
q = Qualified for the next round as a fastest loser or, in field events, by position without achieving the qualifying target
NR = National record
N/A = Round not applicable for the event
Bye = Athlete not required to compete in round

Shooting 

Sri Lanka has qualified a single shooter.

Women

Swimming

Men

Women

See also
 Sri Lanka at the 2002 Asian Games
 Sri Lanka at the 2004 Summer Paralympics

References

External links
Official Report of the XXVIII Olympiad
Sri Lanka Olympic Committee

Nations at the 2004 Summer Olympics
2004
Summer Olympics